Te Hiko Pīata Tama-i-hikoia  (?–1881) was a notable New Zealand tribal leader. Of Māori descent, he identified with the Ngāti Kahungunu, Rangitāne and Ngāti Ira iwi. He was born in Wairarapa, New Zealand.

References

1881 deaths
Ngāti Kahungunu people
Year of birth missing